Rochat is surname. Notable people with the surname include:

Alain Rochat (born 1983), Swiss footballer
Charles-Antoine Rochat (1892–1975), French diplomat
Franziska Rochat-Moser (1966–2002), Swiss long-distance runner
Laurence Rochat (born 1979), Swiss cross-country skier
Philippe Rochat (1953–2015), Swiss chef
Philippe Rochat (aviation), Secretary-General of the International Civil Aviation Organization (1991-1997)
Philippe Rochat (psychologist) (born 1950), Swiss developmental psychologist